Filotex was an Italian professional cycling team that existed from 1963 to 1980. The team's main sponsor from 1976 to 1980 was Italian food producer Sanson.

History
Throughout the 1960s and 1970s, Filotex riders such as Italo Zilioli, Ugo Colombo, and Franco Bitossi consistently placed in the top 10 at the Giro d'Italia. At the 1969 Giro, Zilioli, Colombo, and Bitossi placed in the top 10 of the general classification, with Bitossi winning the points classification.

References

External links

Cycling teams based in Italy
Defunct cycling teams based in Italy
1963 establishments in Italy
1980 disestablishments in Italy
Cycling teams established in 1963
Cycling teams disestablished in 1980